Tracy Lee Hines (born May 1, 1972) is an American professional stunt driver. He was the 2000 USAC Silver Crown Champion and 2002 USAC National Sprint Car Champion. He currently does not have a full-time ride in NASCAR as he competes for Tony Stewart Racing in three USAC series.

NASCAR
Hines made his first attempt at a Busch race in 2000, when he attempted to qualify for the Cheez-It 200 in a car owned by Jimmy Spencer. He did not make the field.

2003
Hines broke into NASCAR career in 2003, when he and NASCAR Craftsman Truck owner Jimb came to an agreement with Hines to run 5 truck races for him in the later portions of 2003.

His career started at Indianapolis Raceway Park (IRP). Hines qualified 30th in the No. 27 Dodge Motorsports Dodge Ram and had just made it into the top-10 when he wrecked and crashed into the wall, finishing 32nd. At the next race at Texas Motor Speedway, he qualified 4th, and ran in the top-15 all day, coming home with an eleventh-place finish. Hines ran his last two races that season at Martinsville Speedway and Phoenix International Raceway. At both races, Hines qualified the No. 7 in 22nd place, and finished 13th.

2004
In 2004, Tommy Baldwin signed Hines to drive three races for the Hungry Drivers program, a Busch Series competition to see who would drive his No. 6 Ragú Dodge Intrepid that season. In his debut at Texas, he started 14th and finished 20th despite a late spin. After a 25th at Talladega Superspeedway, Hines had his best finish of the year, a 17th at Michigan International Speedway.

Hines continued to run in the Truck Series, replacing Matt Crafton in the No. 88 Menards Chevrolet Silverado for ThorSport Racing, competing for NASCAR Rookie of the Year. He finished 20th, 16th and 29th in the first three races, before posting a 5th-place finish at Mansfield Motorsports Speedway. Starting at Texas, Tracy Hines had a streak of 8 straight top-17 finishes, capped off by a 9th at IRP. He also led 2 laps at Gateway. Hines finished off the 2004 season, with a pair of 13ths and earned an 18th-place points finish.

2005
In 2005, the No. 88 had gone back to Crafton, and Paul Wolfe was in the No. 6 Hellmann's Dodge for 2005. Despite a lack of sponsorship, ThorSport fielded a second truck for Hines, the No. 13. In 23 races he finished in the top-20 only 7 times. He was released with two races to go in the season. 

Hines drove one race in 2005 the No. 43 Channellock Dodge for The Curb Agajanian Performance Group at California, where he started 26th and finishing 36th after a late crash. After Wolfe was released from the No. 6, Evernham Motorsports, who now owned the car, hired Hines to drive at The Milwaukee Mile, where he started ninth and finished nineteenth. He also ran at IRP in the No. 6, starting fifth and finishing 24th. Later in the season at Texas, he attempted a Busch race for Glynn Motorsports, however the No. 92 Ultra Comp Trailers Dodge crashed in practice and withdrew.

2006
Tracy Hines was to have signed to drive the No. 92 Glynn Motorsports Dodge in the Busch series, but the team dissolved. Instead, he signed to drive the No. 14 Dodge Charger for FitzBradshaw Racing, with sponsorship from TakeMeOn Vacation, Bluegrass, and JaniKing. Hines was teamed with fellow hoosier Joel Kauffman. After an aborted attempt at Rookie of the Year, Hines resigned from Fitz Bradshaw Racing. Hines plans to spend the rest of this season racing sprint cars.

Return to open-wheel

2007
Hines raced USAC sprint, midget, and Silver Crown cars for Tony Stewart Racing. He sustained a fractured pelvis and left femur, and dislocated right knee in an off-road motorcycle wreck on April 30, 2007.

2008

Hines recorded the fastest ever midget car lap on an asphalt quarter mile at Slinger Super Speedway when he ran a 10.845 second qualifying lap on May 17, 2008.

2009–2013

Hines continued his career in the USAC ranks for several years before returning to NASCAR competition in 2013, driving in the Camping World Truck Series for ThorSport Racing in the inaugural Mudsummer Classic on the  dirt at Eldora Speedway. Hines finished 13th in the event after starting in 16th.

Motorsports career results

NASCAR
(key) (Bold – Pole position awarded by qualifying time. Italics – Pole position earned by points standings or practice time. * – Most laps led.)

Busch Series

Camping World Truck Series

 Season still in progress
 Ineligible for series points

References

External links

Living people
1972 births
People from New Castle, Indiana
Racing drivers from Indiana
NASCAR drivers
World of Outlaws drivers
Evernham Motorsports drivers
USAC Silver Crown Series drivers
A. J. Foyt Enterprises drivers